Peyrolles is a commune in the Gard department in southern France.

On 7 July 2006 the name of the commune was officially changed from Peyroles to Peyrolles.

Population

See also
Communes of the Gard department

References

External links

 Official website 

Communes of Gard